La Mistrine is an album by La Bottine Souriante, released in 1994. It contains the popular song "Martin de la Chasse-galerie", which tells of a famous Quebec legend, and is performed in cooperation with Michel Rivard.

Track listing
"Le Reel des Soucoupes Volantes"
"Ici-bas sur Terre"
"Martin de la Chasse"-galerie
"La Mistrine"
"Le Reel de la Main Blanche"
"La Tourtière"
"Le Reel Irlandais or Bees Wax, Skin Sheep"
"Christophe"
"La Complainte du Folkloriste"
"Le Rap à Ti-Pétang"
"Reel de la Sauvagine"
"Dans nos Vieilles Maisons"

Credits
Musical direction: Jean Fréchette
Engineered and mixed by Paul Pagé
Produced by Paul Pagé, Réjean Archambault, Yves Lambert, Jean Fréchette
Production coordinators: Céline Michaud and François Boudrias
Assistant engineer: Isabelle Larin
Recordings and mix: Studio St-Charles, Longueuil (Canada)
Mastered at SNB Mastering by Bill Kipper
Sleeve designer and graphics: Sylvain Beauséjour
Photography: François Boudrias
Typewriting: Sylvie Tourangeau

Mistrine, La
Mistrine, La